Wanderer is a 1986 action video game developed by Lankhor and published by Pyramide Soft. It was released on Amiga, Amstrad CPC, Atari ST, Commodore 64, Sinclair QL, and ZX Spectrum. The game was authored by  Béatrice & Jean-Luc Langlois. It has the distinction of being Lankhor's first game. It was edited by Pyramid for QL and Atari ST, and then licensed to Elite. Wanderer 3D was released by Encore in 1990.

Plot 
Set in a future where cats have become very valuable, the protagonist's cat has been kidnapped and the kidnapper is asking for an 8000 cat ransom. The player has to visit planets, barter cats, and play a card game to win cats. Visiting new planets engages a straight action sequence of shooting all enemy ships.

Reception 
The Games Machine felt that gameplay was slow and repetitious, and relied too heavily on an average 3D effect. Computer and Video Games felt the overused 3D effect didn't make up for the vacuous gameplay. ZZap!64 criticised the boring gameplay and underused 3D.

References

External links 

 KultPower
 ACE Magazine
 Kultboy
 ASM
 Atari Magazine

1986 video games
Amiga games
Amstrad CPC games
Atari ST games
Commodore 64 games
Shooter video games
Sinclair QL games
Video games developed in France
ZX Spectrum games
Lankhor games